Ary Nogueira Cezar (born 13 April 1919, date of death unknown), known as just Ary, was a Brazilian footballer played as a goalkeeper. He made eight appearances for the Brazil national team from 1945 to 1946. He was also part of Brazil's squad for the 1946 South American Championship.

References

1919 births
Brazilian footballers
Association football goalkeepers
Brazil international footballers
Coritiba Foot Ball Club players
Botafogo Futebol Clube (SP) players
Millonarios F.C. players
Brazilian expatriate footballers
Brazilian expatriate sportspeople in Colombia
Expatriate footballers in Colombia
Year of death missing
Place of birth missing